BandLab Technologies is a Singaporean company that operates a social music platform, called BandLab, and also owns a variety of music-related brands. Founded in 2015, these include Harmony and Heritage Guitars; Guitar.com, NME, Uncut and MusicTech.com media platforms; and Swee Lee musical instrument retailer and distributor.

In December 2021, the company announced a reorganisation under the newly formed parent company Caldecott Music Group (CMG). BandLab Technologies is the music technology division of CMG.

History

BandLab Technologies was founded in 2015 by Kuok Meng Ru and Steve Skillings. Kuok was a Singaporean mathematics graduate from Cambridge University who is the son of agribusiness conglomerate Wilmar International's billionaire founder and CEO Kuok Khoon Hong, and Skillings was the developer of the JamHub audio mixer. Kuok was also the owner of music retailer Swee Lee, acquired in 2012. BandLab Technologies' first product, a Cloud Digital Audio Workstation (DAW) called BandLab, was released in November.

In July 2016, the company acquired Composr, an iOS app for recording audio and making music.  The app and its users were integrated into BandLab.  In September, the company acquired MONO Creators Inc, an American manufacturer of instrument cases, straps and accessories. Also in September, BandLab Technologies acquired 49% of iconic American music magazine Rolling Stone from publisher Wenner Media.

In September 2017, the company acquired Chew.tv, a video streaming service for DJs. The service was renamed Chew By BandLab, and was integrated into BandLab's web platform. Also in September, the company signed a sales and marketing partnership with Heritage Guitars. In November, the company announced it was relaunching the Harmony Company guitar and Teisco musical instrument brand names.

In February 2018, BandLab Technologies acquired digital audio workstation Sonar from musical instrument company Gibson, after Gibson acquired and closed Sonar's developer, parent Cakewalk. Sonar was renamed Cakewalk by BandLab. In October, the company acquired brands including The Guitar Magazine and MusicTech from UK-based publisher Anthem Publishing.

In January 2019, BandLab Technologies sold its 49% stake in Rolling Stone to American publishing company Penske Media. In May, the company bought the music publications NME and Uncut from United Kingdom publisher TI Media. In August, the company announced that it was integrating its livestreaming service Chew into BandLab and renaming it as BandLab Live.

In July 2020, the company released BandLab Albums, software for digital distribution for independent artists. In October 2020, the company reported that 22 million people were using the BandLab app. In March 2021, BandLab Technologies reported that there were 30 million people using the app.

In November 2021, BandLab acquired DIY artist services platform ReverbNation for an undisclosed sum.

In December 2021, the company announced a new parent company, Caldecott Music Group. Caldecott Music Group (CMG) oversees three divisions: BandLab Technologies (technology and software), NME Networks (media), and Vista Musical Instruments (manufacturing, retail, and distribution).

In February 2023, it was announced BandLab had acquired the beat marketplace company, Airbit.

Brands 
Brands within the BandLab Technologies division of CMG:
BandLab – a free online Cloud Digital Audio Workstation (DAW) tool for creating music and collaborating with other musicians. It works in a browser or with a standalone app. Bandlab includes BandLab Albums, a digital distribution tool for musicians, allowing them to also create exclusive content for listeners such as demo tracks and behind-the-scenes videos. The tool also includes BandLab Live, a livestreaming feature. 
Cakewalk by BandLab – a digital audio workstation formerly known as Sonar.
Brands now under NME Networks, a division of CMG (previously part of BandLab Technologies):
Guitar.com – a music news website that also published The Guitar Magazine (published from 1991–2021). It ceased physical magazine publication in December 2021, announcing it would focus solely on the digital offering from January 2022 onwards. 
lab.fm – an online music publication.
MusicTech – an online music technology publication.
NME – formally known as New Musical Express, a UK-based music journalism website and former print publication.
Uncut – a UK-based monthly music and entertainment magazine. (also includes magazines published under the names The Ultimate Music Guide and Ultimate Genre Guide). 
Brands now under Vista Musical Instruments, CMG (previously part of BandLab Technologies):
Harmony Company – originally America's largest musical instrument manufacturer, relaunched in 2018 by BandLab with guitars and amplifiers.
Heritage Guitars – a United States-based guitar manufacturer.
MONO – a manufacturer of instrument cases, straps and accessories.
Teisco – a brand of musical effects pedals.
Swee Lee – a Southeast Asian musical instrument distributor and retailer.

Business model
BandLab Technologies doesn't charge for its software or digital musical content, but instead focuses on retail, manufacturing and media advertising sales.

References

External links
 Official website
 BandLab website

Multinational companies headquartered in Singapore
Singaporean brands
Singaporean companies established in 2015
Music companies
Music journalism
2016 mergers and acquisitions
2017 mergers and acquisitions
2018 mergers and acquisitions
2021 mergers and acquisitions